Oráčov is a municipality and village in Rakovník District in the Central Bohemian Region of the Czech Republic. It has about 400 inhabitants.

Administrative parts
The village of Klečetné is an administrative part of Oráčov.

References

Villages in Rakovník District